Pala is the second album from British alternative dance band Friendly Fires. It was released in the UK on 16 May 2011, and charted at number 6 on the UK Albums Chart. The album name comes from Aldous Huxley's final novel Island, which tells the story of a journalist shipwrecked on the fictional island of Pala, which supports a utopian society. The scarlet macaw photograph was chosen from the private collection of Norwegian fashion photographer Sølve Sundsbø.

Singles
 "Live Those Days Tonight" is the first single taken from the album. The track received its first play on Zane Lowe's show on BBC Radio 1 on 22 March 2011. The band performed the song on Late Night with Jimmy Fallon, and it was released to the US iTunes Store the next day. In the UK, it was released on 16 May 2011, the same day as the album, and charted at number 80 on the UK Singles Chart.
 "Hawaiian Air" was the second single taken from the album. The music video was shot in southern Spain in May 2011. It reached No. 92 in the UK, and appeared on the soundtrack of the 2012 racing video game Forza Horizon alongside "Hurting".
 "Blue Cassette" was released as the third single on 2 December 2011, along with the Tiga Remix of the single.
 "Hurting" was announced as the next single by Nick Grimshaw on BBC Radio 1 on 3 August 2011 with the release date confirmed as 10 October 2011. Remixes of the single were released on 27 February 2012. It appeared on the soundtrack of 2012 racing video game Forza Horizon alongside "Hawaiian Air".

Track listing
Taken from the album booklet:

(*) additional production

Notes
"Live Those Days Tonight" contains a sample of "Albondigas" by Badonday (Toby Tobias and Dave Garnish).
"Hurting" contains a sample of "Lissoms" by Toro y Moi.

Critical reception

The album received a score of 73 on Metacritic (based on 22 reviews), indicating "generally favorable reviews".

Chart positions
Pala debuted on the UK Albums Chart at number 6 on 22 May 2011, that week's second highest debut after Kate Bush's Director's Cut. It also debuted at number 2 on the albums download chart, and number 3 on the UK Indie Chart.

Weekly charts

Year-end charts

As of January 2012 UK sales stand at 90,000 copies according to The Guardian.

References

2011 albums
Albums produced by Paul Epworth
Friendly Fires albums
XL Recordings albums